The 2013 Scotland Sevens was the seventh edition of the tournament and the eighth tournament of the 2012–13 IRB Sevens World Series. The host stadium was the Scotstoun Stadium.

At the end of this event, the top 12 "core teams" (those participating in all series events) on the series table secured their core status for the 2013–14 series. The remaining three core teams will drop to the eight-team World Series Core Team Qualifier, to be held during the season's final event in London. The top three teams at the end of the Core Team Qualifier will also earn core status for 2013–14.

Format
The teams were divided into pools of four teams, who played a round-robin within the pool. Points were awarded in each pool on a different schedule from most rugby tournaments—3 for a win, 2 for a draw, 1 for a loss.
The top two teams in each pool advanced to the Cup competition. The four quarterfinal losers dropped into the bracket for the Plate. The Bowl was contested by the third- and fourth-place finishers in each pool, with the losers in the Bowl quarterfinals dropping into the bracket for the Shield.

Teams
The participating teams were:

Pool stage
The draw was made on March 31.

Pool A

Pool B

Pool C

Pool D

Knockout stage

Shield

Bowl

Plate

Cup

References

External links

Scotland Sevens
Scotland Sevens
Scotland Sevens
Scotland Sevens|Scotland Sevens
Scotland Sevens